Kingston Mines is a blues nightclub in Lincoln Park, Chicago, Illinois. The club derived its name from the Kingston Mines Theatre Company founded by June Pyskacek in 1969 at 2356 N. Lincoln Avenue and named after Kingston Mines, Illinois, where the father of one of its actors, Jack Wallace, worked. Pyskacek allowed Harry Hoch and a partner open  a café and performance space in the front of the building. Called the Kingston Mines Company Store, it was acquired circa 1972 by Lenin "Doc" Pellegrino, M.D., and renamed the Kingston Mines Café. Although the original production of Grease was written and first premiered at the Kingston Mines Theatre in 1971 before moving to Broadway a year later, the theatre company expired in 1973, while the Café survived as a blues club. It moved to its current location at 2548 N. Halsted in 1982.

Kingston Mines showcases a variety of blues by two separate bands, every night, on two stages, 365 days a year; from delta blues to Chicago blues.  Their featured bands/artists cover a broad and diverse spectrum of the genre.  Kingston Mines is still owned by the Pellegrino family and it is "the oldest, continuously operating blues club in Chicago."  Blues legends such as Koko Taylor, Carl Weathersby, and Magic Slim have played there; among a myriad more.    The Kingston Mines has two alternating "headline" performances on its two stages into the early morning, every night.  Carl Weathersby, Linsey Alexander, Eddie Shaw, Mike Wheeler, Peaches Staten, Joanna Connor, and Ronnie Hicks are regular performers.

The club was awarded the "Keeping the Blues Alive Award for Blues Clubs" by the Blues Foundation in 2014.

References

Music venues in Chicago
Chicago blues
Nightclubs in Chicago